IEC 61108 is a collection of IEC standards for "Maritime navigation and radiocommunication equipment and systems - Global navigation satellite systems (GNSS)".

The 61108 standards are developed in Working Group 4 (WG 4A) of Technical Committee 80 (TC80) of the IEC.

Sections of IEC 61108
Standard IEC 61108 is divided into four parts:
 Part 1: Global positioning system (GPS) - Receiver equipment - Performance standards, methods of testing and required test results 
 Part 2: Global navigation satellite system (GLONASS) - Receiver equipment - Performance standards, methods of testing and required test results
 Part 3: Galileo receiver equipment - Performance requirements, methods of testing and required test results 
 Part 4:  Part 4: Shipborne DGPS and DGLONASS maritime radio beacon receiver equipment - Performance requirements, methods of testing and required test results

History
On 1 December 2000, the International Maritime Organization - IMO adopted three resolutions regarding the characteristics of shipped GNSS receivers.

IMO Resolutions
On 1 December 2000, the International Maritime Organization - IMO adopted three resolutions regarding the performance standards for shipborne GNSS receivers:
 IMO RESOLUTION MSC.112(73) GLOBAL POSITIONING SYSTEM (GPS) RECEIVER EQUIPMENT
 IMO RESOLUTION MSC.113(73) GLONASS RECEIVER EQUIPMENT
 IMO RESOLUTION MSC.114(73) DGPS AND DGLONASS MARITIME RADIO BEACON RECEIVER EQUIPMENT
 IMO RESOLUTION MSC.233(82) GALILEO RECEIVER EQUIPMENT (adopted on 5 December 2006)

References

External links
 Official IEC website
 TC80 brochure
 
61108
Electronic engineering